Soft Snow Pass is a snow pass at about 2,000 m at the head of Osuga Glacier, a tributary of Trafalgar Glacier in the Victory Mountains, Victoria Land. So named by the New Zealand Antarctic Research Program (NZARP) geological party led by M.G. Laird, 1981–82, from the unusually soft snow encountered in the pass.

Mountain passes of Victoria Land
Borchgrevink Coast